Pathanamthitta, is a municipality situated in the Central Travancore region in the state of Kerala, India, spread over an area of 23.50 km2. It is the administrative capital of Pathanamthitta district. The town has a population of 37,538. The Hindu pilgrim centre Sabarimala is situated in the Pathanamthitta district; as the main transport hub to Sabarimala, the town is known as the 'Pilgrim Capital of Kerala'. Pathanamthitta District, the thirteenth revenue district of the State of Kerala, was formed with effect from 1 November 1982, with headquarters at Pathanamthitta. Forest covers more than half of the total area of the District. Pathanamthitta District ranks the 7th in area in the State. The district has its borders with Allepey, Kottayam, Kollam and Idukki districts of Kerala and Tamil Nadu.Nearest City Is Thiruvalla,Located At A Distance Of 30 km .Thiruvalla Railway Station Is 30 km via Thiruvalla-Kumbazha Highway.Buses Ply Every 4 Minutes From Thiruvalla To Pathanamthitta & Vice Versa.

History 
The regions that form the town were formerly under the rule of Pandalam, which had connections with the Pandya kingdom. It is believed that Hindu God Lord Ayyappa was the King of this region. When Pandalam was added to the princely state of Travancore in 1820, the region came under Travancore administration.

Modern day Pathanamthitta District, the thirteenth revenue district of the State of Kerala was formed with effect from 1 November 1982, with headquarters at Pathanamthitta. It was formed due to the efforts made by Indian politician K. K. Nair. He is known as the founder of Pathanamthitta District.

Geography 
Pathanamthitta has an average elevation of 18 metres (62 ft) above sea level.

The main trunk road from south to Sabarimala starts from MC Road at Adoor via NH 183A Pathanamthitta. From The North it Starts from Thiruvalla MC Road and Continues through State Highway 7 (Kerala), The Main Eastern Highway (Punalur-Muvattupuzha Road/SH-08), Main Central Road (Kesavadasapuram-Angamaly Road/SH-01), NH 183A Kollam -Teni via Adoor- Pathanamthitta.

Climate 

Pathanamthitta has a Tropical monsoon climate bordering a Tropical rainforest climate, more or less the same as is prevalent elsewhere in Kerala. Annual temperatures range between 20 °C (68 °F) and 39 °C (102 °F). The district experiences three distinct weather conditions: winter, summer and the monsoon. The winter season is experienced from December to February and summer season from March to May. There are two rainy seasons: The South-West monsoon (June to September) and the North-East monsoon (October to November). The South-West monsoon is usually very heavy. About 75% of its annual rainfall is received during this season.

The town enjoys a tropical climate, the monsoons start in June. The months of April–May can get pretty humid. The best weather is from October to February.
Pathanamthitta experiences three distinct seasons: summer, monsoon and winter.  Typical summer months are from March to May.  The warmest month in Pathanamthitta is April. Although summer doesn't end until May, the city often receives locally developed heavy thundershowers in May (although humidity remains high).

The monsoon lasts from June to August, with moderate rainfall. Most of the heavy rainfall in the city falls between June and July, and June is the wettest month of the year. The Last weeks of June is also days of floods. The three major rivers viz Pampa, Achankovil and Manimala swell with rainwater.

Winter begins in December. December through February are the winter months. The lowest temperatures are experienced during January.

According to the latest World Health Organisation (WHO) study on ambient air quality among 123 Indian cities, Pathanamthitta was found to have the cleanest air in India, in terms of least concentration of dust particles in air.  Two out of the three least polluted cities in India are from Kerala, Kollam being the second least polluted.  As per the database, in Pathanamthitta, the annual mean of PM10 and PM2.5 is recorded at 23 and 10 respectively, which is closer to the recommended level of concentration of particulate matter.  While a number of Indian cities are among the world's most polluted, Pathanamthitta's air quality is comparable to some of the cleanest cities in North America, Europe and Australia.

Economy

Agriculture
Agriculture is the main occupation of the people. About 75% people are dependent on this sector. The hilly terrain coupled with high humidity makes the region suitable for rubber plantations. Paddy is the most important crop cultivated in the wet lands. Tapioca and pulses are the important dry land crops. Other major crops are coconut, banana, pepper and ginger. In certain areas cashew, pineapple, sugarcane, cocoa and other tree spices are cultivated. The land available for cultivation is less since sizeable area of the district is reserve forest.

 Source : Statistics for Planning-DES 2006

Fisheries
Pathanamthitta district has a unique position in the inland fisheries map of Kerala state with its freshwater resources like rivers, reservoirs, streams, ponds, quarries and paddy fields. The fisheries activities in this region started with the establishment of a Fresh Water Survey Station. The district has an Ornamental Fish Breeding resource centre and a National Fish Seed Farm. There are 2444 fishermen depending on this sector for their livelihood.

Administration 

Pathanamthitta assembly constituency was part of the Idukki (Lok Sabha constituency) but now Pathanamthitta is a separate Lok Sabha constituency.
Pathanamthitta comes under Aranmula Assembly constituency. Earlier, Pathanamthitta itself was an Assembly constituency. But after delimitation, Pathanamthitta lost its named constituency.

The district headquarters is at Pathanamthitta town. The district administration is headed by the District Collector. He is assisted by five Deputy Collectors holding charges of general matters, revenue recovery, land acquisition, land reforms and election.
Under the three tier system of panchayat in rural areas, Pathanamthitta has one district panchayat, 9 block panchayat and 57 grama panchayats.
Under the single tier system in urban areas, there are 4 municipalities the district. In addition, there is a census town (Kozhencherry).

As per the Delimitation of Parliamentary and Assembly Constituencies Order, 2008, Pathanamthitta has five Assembly constituencies, down from eight. However, the district was unified into a single Parliamentary constituency, thus contributing a seat to the Lok Sabha. The Pathanamthitta parliamentary constituency is formed by including all the five Assembly constituencies of the district along with two other Assembly constituencies in the neighboring Kottayam district.

Indian National Congress, the CPM/CPI, Bharathiya Janatha party(BJP)and[Kerala Congress]] are the main political parties.

Municipalities: 4

 Thiruvalla
 Pathanamthitta
 Adoor
 Pandalam

Transportation

Airport
The proposed Sabari International Airport, Cheruvally would be the closest airport upon completion, at 28 km away from Pathanamthitta town.

Thiruvananthapuram International Airport (113 km), Cochin International Airport, at Nedumbassery, Kochi (142 km) are the nearest airports.

Heliport
Perunad Heliport (helipad) is situated in Kuttikayam estate, Mampara road. Which is known as Sabarimala helipad. Chipsan Aviation Pvt Ltd, having service from various location. Most of the Sabarimala pilgrimages are using this heliport.

Railway
Chengannur railway station (Code: CNGR) (24 km) is the nearest Railway station. Tiruvalla railway station (Code: TRVL) (30 km) is the only railway station in the District. Mavelikara railway station (Code: MVLK) (32.5 km) is also nearest station after Chengannur and Tiruvalla stations. Kollam Junction Railway Station (Code: QLN) is 62 km away from Pathanamthitta. The location of Chengannur private bus stand in front of the station makes it the most convenient one. Direct Bus services to Pathanamthitta are operated from both Tiruvalla and Chengannur.
The proposed Chengannur – Pandalam – Kottarakkara – Thiruvananthapuram railway line passes through the district.

Road 

Pathanamthitta is the meeting point of two major State Highways T.K. Road (SH – 07) and Main Eastern Highway (Punalur-Muvattupuzha Road / SH – 08).  The town is well connected to major towns and cities inside and outside Kerala by the State run K.S.R.T.C and private buses as well as Luxury Services.  Both the KSRTC and private buses play equal roles in satisfying the transportation needs of the town.  The cities of Kollam, Thiruvananthapuram, Kochi, Thrissur etc. are connected by KSRTC services whereas hi-range townships like Punalur, Kumali, Pala and the Malabar Area of Northern Kerala are connected by private bus services.  KSRTC is running chain services that connect Pathanamthitta with the City of Kollam via Adoor, Also to Chengannur railway via Elavumthitta or Kozhencherry. Plenty of A/C Luxury Bus services are operated from Pathanamthitta to Bangalore, Chennai, Mangalore and Mumbai on a daily basis.

KSRTC bus depots in Pathanamthitta district are Pathanamthitta, Konni,Thiruvalla, Adoor, Mallapally, KSRTC Operating centers are situated in Ranni, Pandalam and a Temporary KSRTC Depot working during Sabarimala season at Pamba.

Tourism 

Pathanamthitta district is known as the Headquarters of Pilgrimage Tourism, of the Kerala State. Situated near the Western Ghats and bordered by the hills, Pathanamthitta district is a treat to eyes with its vast unending stretches of forests, rivers and rural landscapes. Blessed by nature, the district is famous for its scenic beauty, fairs and festivals. Land of Lord Ayyappa is the tag-line of Pathanamthitta tourism.
Pathanamthitta attracts a large number of tourists every year. Pilgrim centres and other eco tourism spots like Gavi and Adavi are most visited in Pathanamthitta.

Distance from Pathanamthitta 
 Konni (10;Km)
 Kozhencherry (13 km)
 Ranny (15 km)
 Pandalam (16 km)
 Adoor (17 km)
 Kalanjoor (22 km)
 Chengannur (24 km)
 Thiruvalla (30.7 km)
 Mavelikara (32 km)
 Kayamkulam (40 km)
 Kottayam (58 km)
 Sabarimala (65 km)

Culture zone 
Places around Pathanamthitta city within a distance of 15 km include, Elanthoor, Ranny, Vadaserikara, Kozhencherry, Vechoochira, Kadammanitta, Vazhamuttom, Adoor, Pandalam, Manjinikara, Mathoor, Cheekanal, Omallur, Malayalappuzha, Kodumthara, Elavumthitta-Muloor Smarakam, Kodumon, Kalanjoor, Ayroor Cherukolpuzha, Ulanadu, Kaipattoor, Mylapra, Uthimoodu, Thumpamon, Maroor, Pramadom, Konni, Chengara and Valamchuzhy. The places beyond these are Thiruvalla, Nilackal, Parumala, and Maramon. Pathanamthitta lies on the road route to the pilgrim town of Sabarimala, which is 65 km away. The Chettikulangara temple, at Mavelikkara is about 35 km from Pathanamthitta. Padanilam Parabrahma Temple is situated 26 km from Pathanamthitta.  Aranmula is around 14 km from Pathanamthitta. Aranmula Temple is one of the biggest temples in South India en route to Sabarimala.

 Sabarimala Mandala Pooja.
 Maramon Convention was recorded in 2010 as one of the largest Christian gatherings in Asia. The annual conventions are held during the first half of February.
 Cherukolpuzha Hindu matha convention
 Aranmula annual boat race.
 Aranmula Kannadi – Centuries old art of mirror making from metal composites.
 Kumbanadu Convention is the largest Pentecostal peoples gathering at Kumbanadu.

Notable people from Pathanamthitta District 

See List of people from Pathanamthitta District

Demographics 
As per Census of India 2011 Pathanamthitta district had a population
of 11,97,412 (11.97 Lakh) and which was lower than 12.34
lakh of previous Census of 2001. Males constitute 46.9% of the population and
females 53.1%. 89% of Total population in Pathanamthitta lives in Rural area
and only 11% lives in urban. Pathanamthitta District ranks the 12th
place in terms of population size in the state. In total density of the District
is 452 Persons per km2 which the 12th in States as per 2011 Census. In
Sex-ratio, the District is in the 2nd position with 1132 females per 1,000
males. In Child Sex-ratio, the District has the 1st rank with 976 female
children per 1000 male children. The District has the second position in total
literacy rate (96.55 per cent) and female literacy rate (95.83 per cent). Agricultural
Labourers constitute 14.1 per cent while Cultivators form 10.5 per cent of the
Total Workers in the District. There are five engineering colleges and one medical college in Pathanamthitta District.

Religion 

Hinduism (57%) is the majority faith in Pathanamthitta.Christians (38%) forms significant minority.

Religious conventions
 The Cherukolpuzha Convention, in Pathanamthitta is an important religious convention of the Hindus. It is held at Cherukole on the sand banks of Pamba River, usually in February every year. It is organized by the Ayroor-Cherukolpuzha Hindumatha Maha Mandalam at Vidyadhiraja Nagar at Ayroor village.
 The Maramon Convention, one of the largest Christian convention in Asia, is held at Maramon, Pathanamthitta, Kerala, India annually during the month of February on the vast sand-bed of the Pampa River next to the Kozhencherry Bridge. It is organised by Malabar Mar Thoma Syrian Christian Evangelistic Association, commonly known as MTEA, the missionary wing of the Malankara Mar Thoma Syrian Church.
Kumbanad Convention is the second largest Christian convention in Kerala and it is the general convention of India Pentecostal Church of God.It is held at the second last week of January annually at Hebronpuram, Kumbanad.
 Madhya Thiruvithamcore Syrian convention held every year during the 3 day Lent in February. It was started in 1918 under the auspices of Thumpamon diocese and is held on the grounds of  St Stephen's cathedral, Makamkunnu, Pathanamthitta. It was started when Thengumtharayil Geevarghese corepiscopa was the vicar of the church. It is the oldest and largest convention in the orthodox Syrian church.

Places of Worship 

 The Sabarimala Sree Ayyappa Temple, a world-famous pilgrim centre, situated in the Sabarimala hills in the Pathanamthitta district. It is known as the 'Pilgrim Capital of Kerala'.
 Aranmula Parthasarathy Temple is one of the Divya Desams, the 108 temples of Vishnu revered by 12 poet saints, or Alwars.
 Anikkattilammakshethram, Shivaparvathy temple 
 Thrikalanjoor SreeMahadeva Temple
 Vaipur Mahadeva Temple
 Malayalappuzha Devi Temple in Malayalappuzha
 St.Peter's Malankara Syrian Catholic Cathedral,Pathanamthitta
 Assemblies of God in India, Thiruvalla
 India Pentecostal Church of God, Hebronpuram, Kumbanad
 St. Peter and St. Paul's Church, Parumala
 St. George Orthodox Church, Mylapra, also known as 'Mylapra Valiyapalli
 St Mary's Orthodox Church, Kallooppara

Flora and fauna 

Pathanamthitta has tropical biodiversity with forest, plantations, rivers and fertile land. Fifty percent of the district is covered with forest, providing rich flora and fauna. The district has a variety of plants including medicinal, spices, tuber crops and those yielding fruits and fiber. Aromatic plants and spices such as pepper, ginger, cardamom and turmeric are cultivated on a large scale. Trees such as timber, teak, rosewood, jack tree, manjakadambu, anjili, pala can be found in abundance.

The forests of the district have excellent wild life habitats. A variety of animals and birds can be found. Tigers, elephants, gaur, deer, monkeys and other wild animals are found in the forest. Giant squirrel, lion-tailed macaques, barking deer and bear can also be spotted in the reserve. Malabar grey hornbill and great Indian hornbill are found. Pathanamthitta also houses the Indian peacock. Wide variety of other birds such as sunbirds, woodpeckers and kingfishers can also be seen.

The existence of the wildlife habitat is under threat from various areas. Pollution from fertilizer and industries and illegal sand mining are the major threats. Issues connected to Sabarimala pilgrimage such as clearing of forest land and large amount of waste discharged also threatens the habitat.

Educational Institutions

Sports 
Main stadiums in the town are Pathanamthitta K. K. Nair Stadium and Pathanamthitta Indoor Stadium. Other stadiums include Pramadom Rajiv Gandhi Indoor Stadium. These stadiums host sports events in state, district levels and is also used for other purposes.

Cultural Sports
The Aranmula Boat Race is part of a festival celebrated during the month of September. Though the snake boat race is also performed at nearby places, the race held at Aranmula is unique because of the boats' shape and design. Maramadimatsaram (Ox Race) is another such seasonal sport. This is held as part of the largest annual cattle fair of Central Travancore region. The race is held in three categories.

See also
Kubhazha
Kudamuck
Kurisumuttom

Notes

References 
 pib.nic.in

External links 

 pathanamthittainfo.com
 http://www.elanthoordevi.org

 
Cities and towns in Pathanamthitta district
Tourist attractions in Pathanamthitta district